Gatti is an Italian name. Notable people with the surname include:

Alessandra Mirka Gatti, Italian Eurobeat singer
Annibale Gatti, Italian 19th-century fresco painter
Armand Gatti (1924–2017), French playwright
Arturo Gatti, Italian-Canadian professional boxer
Attilio Gatti, Italian explorer of Africa
Bernardino Gatti, Italian painter of the Renaissance
Bruno Gatti (* 1941), Swiss footballer
Carlo Gatti, Swiss entrepreneur in the Victorian era
Carmine Biagio Gatti (born 1988), Italian professional football player 
Claudio Gatti, Italian investigative journalist based in New York City
Daniele Gatti, Italian conductor
Darío Javier Franco Gatti (born 1969), Argentine football manager and a former international footballer
Eduardo Gatti (born 1949), Chilean singer-songwriter
Elena Gatti Caporaso (1918–1999), Italian socialist politician and feminist
Emilio Gatti (1922–2016), Italian engineer and  professor of nuclear electronics at the Politecnico of Milan
Enrico Gatti (born 1955), Italian violinist, known for playing Baroque music
Enrique Gatti, German musician of the English and German indie rock band Art Brut
Fabio Gatti, Italian footballer
Fabrizio Gatti (born 1966), Italian investigative journalist and author
Fortunato Gatti (early 17th century) was an Italian painter active near Parma and Modena
Franco Gatti (born 1942), the founder of the Italian group Ricchi e Poveri
Gabriele Gatti, Sammarinese politician
Gabriella Gatti (1908–2003), Italian operatic soprano
Gervasio Gatti (c. 1550–c. 1631), Italian late-Renaissance, active in Parma, Piacenza, and Cremona
Giacomo Gatti (died 1817), Italian painter of the late-Baroque, active mainly in his native Mantua 
Girolamo Gatti (1682–1726), Italian painter, active mainly in Bologna.
Giulio Gatti-Casazza, Italian opera manager
Guido Carlo Gatti (born 1938), Italian former basketball player
Héctor Gustavo Gatti (born 1972), former Argentine footballer 
Hugo Gatti, former Argentine professional football goalkeeper
Isabelle Laure Gatti de Gamond (1839–1905), Belgian educationalist, feminist, and politician
Jennifer Gatti, American television actress
Joe Gatti (born 1967), Canadian former middleweight boxer 
John Maria Emilio Gatti, Sir (1872–1929), Anglo-Swiss theatre manager, restaurateur and businessman
Lou Gatti (1915-1977), Australian rules footballer 
Lucas Cassius Gatti (born 1978), retired Argentine football midfielder
Luigi Gatti (composer) (1740–1817), Venetian classical composer
Luigi Gatti (businessman) (1875–1912), restaurateur 
Luigi Gatti (weightlifter), Italian weightlifter
Luigi Gatti (politician) (1913–1945), Italian politician
Luigi Gatti (nuncio) (born 1946), Vatican diplomat 
Marcello Gatti (1924–2013), Italian cinematographer
María Ester Gatti de Islas (1918–2010), Uruguayan teacher and human rights activist
Natalia Gatti (born 1982), Argentine female football forward
Mauro Gatti (born 1937), a retired Italian professional football player and coach
Nando Gatti (1927-date of death unknown), former South African international lawn bowler
Oliviero Gatti (1579–1648), Italian painter and engraver
Pierluigi Gatti (born 1938), Italian athlete
Rafael Savério Gatti (born 1984), Brazilian football goalkeeper
Riccardo Gatti (born 1997), Italian football player
Federico Gatti (born 1998), Italian football player
Roberto Gatti (born 1954), retired Italian football defender and later manager
Roberto Cazzolla Gatti (born 1984), Italian environmental and evolutionary biologist 
Saturnino Gatti (1463–1518), Italian painter and sculptor 
Simon Gatti, Canadian footballer
Stanlee Gatti (born 1955), American event designer
Theobaldo di Gatti (c.1650-1727), Florentine composer and musician

Italian-language surnames